The sculptor John Bridgeman was commissioned in the early 1960s by playground designer Mary Frances Mitchell, to create an abstract sculpture in concrete, for a Birmingham City Council playground, on Curtis Gardens, on a housing estate on Fox Hollies Road in the Acocks Green district of Birmingham, England. It has been described as "fish like".

It is the only one of a series of playground sculptures by Bridgeman, who was head of sculpture at Birmingham College of Arts and Crafts until 1981, to survive. It was originally painted in a metallic sheen, but this is now mostly worn off.

In February 2015, the untitled piece was grade II listed by the Department for Culture, Media and Sport, on the advice of Historic England, giving it legal protection from removal or alteration.

References

External links 

 

Outdoor sculptures in England
Concrete sculptures in England
1960s sculptures
Tourist attractions in Birmingham, West Midlands
Grade II listed buildings in Birmingham
Sculptures in Birmingham, West Midlands